The racial composition of swimming and other aquatic sports has long been influenced by the history of segregation and violence at pools as well as the building patterns of public and private pools in America.

Beginning of Pools in America

Pools as Bath Houses 
When swimming first became popular in America, pools were segregated by gender and class, not race. At the end of the 19th century and early 20th century, municipal pools were built in the north mainly for poor, urban, working class Americans and used as bathing sites. Large groups of working class men and women flocked into their gender assigned public pools and rid themselves of the dirt and grime acquired over the course of their day, while wealthier middle and upper class citizens used their own private baths to clean. This picture changed as a result of the redefinition of the germ theory of disease in the late 1890s. This change concluded that disease was not linked to dirtiness but rather linked to small microbes transferred by physical contact between people and the touching of shared objects or spaces. Pools, as the bathing site for many working class Americans, were now recognized as a public health danger so cities built bath house facilities instead of pools.

Transforming the Purpose of Pools 
After this revelation of the germ theory of disease, the influence and popularity of pools was not completely diminished but rather transformed. Pools became an arena for exercise, leisure, and sport - not cleanliness. In West Chicago Park, the Chicago Douglass Park Pool was built for the purpose of sport with a longer length suited for race competition, areas for spectators, and springboards. Initially, the facilities brought together a diverse group of pool goers with people of all races from nearby middle and lower class neighborhoods attending. However, soon the park board began charging an entry fee to cut down on the costs of the park, but also rid it of the boisterous lower class boys that always seemed to cause problems. It was entry fees and intentionally choosing wealthier areas to be the host of pools that sidelined many lower class Americans, both Black and white, from using the nice public pools.

Gender Segregation 
From the 1890s to the 1920s, many pools were gender segregated due to the visual and physical intimacy created by the pool deck atmosphere. Swimming suits for both men and women involved minimal clothing and coverage, thus making the pool deck area visually intimate. In addition, the social and interactive aspects of swimming also made way for more physical contact, both intentional and accidental, between fellow swimmers. The issue of men and women swimming together eventually became the grounds by which many pools were segregated.

Racial segregation of pools in America

Transition to Racial Segregation

Intimacy of Pools 
In the 1920s during the first pool building boom in the United States, pools began to be gender integrated in an attempt to promote family, community, and the pool as a prominent area for socialization. As gender integration was implemented, racial segregation was simultaneously adopted due to the physical and visual intimacy of swimming attire and pool decks. Pools physically intimacy, stemming from the sharing of the same water, made way for racist assumptions determining that Black Americans were dirtier and thus had more diseases that white people could contract from swimming together. Also, because of the minimal coverage of swimsuits and close proximity of pool goers, the racist belief that Black men were “sexually aggressive” led to racial segregation of pools because white men didn't want Black men and white women to interact. The white community feared that integrated pools would allow Black men to “visually consume”, touch, assault, and rape white women. The threat of sexual violence on white women was the grounds by which pools were segregated.

The Great Migration 
The Great Migration changed the matter of cleanliness in pools from a class issue from the 1890s to the 1910s to a race issue from the 1920s to the 1930s due to the development of city slums of Black Americas.

The Great Migration was the movement of millions of Black Americans from the rural south to north, west, and midwest cities from the mid 1910s to the 1930s. A key impact of the Great Migration is the development of redlining and race restrictive housing covenants in the north to concentrate Black Americans in specific neighborhoods. Black communities dealt with restrictive housing covenants and higher rent prices which left many Black Americans with minimal options for housing. As a result, Black families were forced to subdivide their apartments and cram in extra tenants to make the inflated monthly rent payments, which left little money or time for regular maintenance of their homes. Black neighborhoods quickly became run down and overcrowded at the hands of this cycle. From a white Americans' perspective, Black migrants replaced the poor, white, European immigrants that previously inhabited the slums: the noticeably dilapidated working class neighborhoods were now solely identified as Black communities. The worry of disease transmission in bathhouses and recreational pools was now linked to Black Americans. Pools were also unlikely to be built in or near these overcrowded black neighborhoods and entry and membership fees for other pools would have been unaffordable to Black Americans. The Great Migration shifted the societal view on cleanliness to an issue of the Black community and created deteriorated Black neighborhoods with little access to aquatic facilities.

Enforcement of Segregation

De Jure Segregation 
Local governments officially segregated pools in their cities and deployed police officers to enforce these laws.

De Facto Segregation 
For pools that were not legally segregated, white swimmers intimidated and inflicted violence, such as drownings and beatings, on Black swimmers to enforce the divisions.

New Deal & swimming 
Following the initial pool boom from 1920 to 1929, public pool construction slowed as the Great Depression began. Under part of Franklin D. Roosevelt's New Deal which aimed to resolve massive unemployment by funding in public works projects from roads and schools to swimming pools. The building and repair and renovation of pools also gave jobs to millions of unemployed Americans under the New Deal agency known as the Civil Works Administration (CWA) which later became the Works Progress Administration (WPA). In the United States, the WPA workers built 805 new swimming pools and 848 wading pools while repairing or improving 339 existing pools. The pools built and improved were described to be "examples of state-of-the-art engineering" with "massive filtration systems, heating units, and even underwater lighting" and also able to adapt to off-season recreation uses like tennis, handball, and volleyball. Pools were built in even the smallest towns and cities uniting the communities in recreation and companionship and serving as a reminder of the government's assistance during the crisis of the Great Depression.

Desegregation of pools

Legal End of Segregation 

In the early 1960s, African American swimmers were still banned from swimming in white owned pool in places such as Centennial Park Swimming Pool in Nashville, Tennessee. Although some cities and public pools already had begun the process of desegregation, in 1954, due to the Brown v. Board of Education decision that declared the separate but equal doctrine unconstitutional, segregation in the public sphere became illegal. Thus the division of public pools on the basis of race also became illegal because the designation of public pools based on race was inherenty unequal. Later, the Civil Rights Act of 1964 further made the segregation of public facilities illegal by prohibiting discrimination on the basis of race and color.

White Flight 
Despite this judicial decision and government legislation, because many pools were unofficially segregated through violence and intimidation by white swimmers, the issue of access for the Black community in many ways persisted. Desegregation often brought intense racial conflict at pools so sometimes Blacks were not admitted on the grounds that their use would cause “disorder” among pool goers. In addition, instead of participating in integrated swimming, whites fled in mass numbers to the newly developed suburbs home to their private home pools and extensive aquatic facilities provided by their expensive, member-only country clubs. For example, the average number of daily white swimmers at a pool in Druid Park, Baltimore plummeted from 775 swimmers in 1955 to just six swimmers in 1956 post desegregation. This retreat marked a new private pool building boom that took place during the 1950s and 1960s which was almost exclusively accessible to whites. The boom included the construction of thousands of house pools and private swim clubs in suburban America. During the mass construction of private pools, the Federal Housing Administration openly discouraged the building of public pools, which were most accessible to Black and lower class Americans, but encouraged private pools, which were solely available to wealthy whites living in the suburbs.

Closure of Public Pools in American Cities 
Private club memberships and home pools were exclusively available to wealthy, mainly white, Americans and their departure of the cities left the state of public pools uncertain. Without white Americans flocking to the pools for exercise and on hot summer days, there was no longer an urgent need for public pools. Cities closed and defunded pools altogether leaving almost no pools for the millions of Blacks concentrated in American cities.

Palmer v. Thompson 
The Supreme Court case Palmer v. Thompson addressed the issue of shutting down public pools - the only pools accessible to the poor- post desegregation. The case involved the city of Jackson, Mississippi closing four public pools and transferring the fifth to the YMCA, which was only available to whites. In 1971, the court ruled that the city government could choose to not operate their desegregated facilities if the decision appeared neutral at face value and they are spreading “equal damage” on each person in the area. However, in reality the damage was not equal: the city closed all of the public pools that were affordable to lower income residents whom were largely composed of Black Americans.

Instances of Violence

Highland Park Pool (Pittsburg, PA) 
On opening day of the pool park in 1931, that included two gender integrated pools, a sun deck, and a sandy beach area that overall could hold 10,000 people, prospective Black swimmers were asked to present a “health certificate” indicating the individual was disease free, while white swimmers entered without problem. When some Black swimmers were finally able to get into the park area, violence ensued: a group of Black swimmers who endured verbal intimidation to enter the pool were pelted by rocks, dunked, and punched by white swimmers, while police stationed on deck did nothing except charge the Black swimmers with inciting a riot. In 1935, a Girl Scout troop composed of Black youth organized a day to go to Highland Park Pool with the assistance of the mayor of Pittsburg. The girls were dunked and splashed by a mob of white youth as stationed police officers turned a blind eye.

Paulson Pool (Pittsburg, PA) 
In July 1935, at the gender-segregated Paulson Pool, nine year old Frank Reynolds was punched and kicked in the dressing room by a gang of white kids then later held underwater by the same group. When Reynolds’ mother filed a police report, inspector Kellie of the local police station, scolded her saying “Why can’t you people use the Washington Boulevard pool (the pool designated for Black swimmers also known as the “Jim Crow Pool”) … I don’t approve of colored and white people swimming together”.

Fairgrounds Pool Park (St. Louis, MO) 
The Fairgrounds Pool Park, originally built in 1919, reopened on June 21, 1949 for the first day of racially integrated swimming. Black swimmers lined up to enter the pool while being berated by loud boos from white youth outside of the fence surrounding the area. Inside the pool park, a Black man and white youth were stabbed and ten plus others were injured during the ongoing violence that took place over the course of the entire day. Some intimidated Black swimmers who retreated from the pool were followed and beaten up in a nearby street, while those that stayed faced attacks by whites in the pool.

When the pool closed to youths at 5pm, a white mob that had been growing the entire day roamed the park with bats and clubs attacking every Black person in sight. This event became known as the Fairground Park riot: an event of such violence that the city of St. Louis resorted to segregation to maintain the peace.

The NAACP fought the decision to re-segregate the pool and filed a lawsuit that eventually ended segregation at Fairgrounds pool park the very next summer. That summer, the number of swimmers plummeted from 313,000 to 10,000 swimmers and just six years later in 1956 the pool was closed completely.

Swimming at Historically Black Colleges and Universities

Howard University 

As far back as the 1920s, African American swim coach Clarence Pendleton made significant efforts to have the Howard University swim team nationally recognized and award the team the ability to compete with other swim teams. By 1933 he was no longer coaching the team but returned to Howard to give a talk about swimming. In the 1950s, while recreational facilities were still segregated in Washington, D.C., Pendleton worked as a superintendent for the "colored" facilities. Despite continued employment in aquatics and recreational jobs, Pendlton Sr. and his wife struggled financially due to segretation. Pendleton Sr. instilled a strong work ethic in his son, Clarence M. Pendleton Jr., who also coached the Howard Swim team. Pendleton, Jr., who was also known as Penny, was quoted as saying his father was a strict disciplinarian who highly valued education and frequently told his son, "If you don't think, you stink." In 1965, Pendleton, Jr. traveled to Egypt to coach and mentor Egyptian athletes. In the 1980s, Pendleton's son controversially served as chair of the United States Commission on Civil Rights under President Ronald Reagan.

Howard University is the only HBCU Division 1 team in the United States. As a team that is composed of almost all black swimmers, they are actively fighting the stereotype that black people are less capable swimmers. This assumption along with the fact that minority Americans are twice as likely to drown than white Americans have prompted the Howard team to fight this problem. Occasionally, the team, Sigma Gamma Rho sorority, and Olympians Maritza McClendon and Cullen Jones have worked together to provide free swim clinics to kids in the DC community.

Sandra Ann Arrington 
In 1966 a woman named Sandra Ann Arrington from Columbus, Ohio joined coach Clarence Pendleton, Jr.'s team roster at Howard University as the only woman on the swim team. She was promised the opportunity to tryout for the team when she enrolled at Howard. While at Howard she competed in numerous swimming events and majored in physical education. As a result of her accomplishments in the pool, Arrington was featured in both Jet and Ebony Magazines. In December 1966 she won first place in a diving competition against Millersville State College. The press coverage highlighting her accomplishments frequently mentioned her gender. For example, the Howard University Hilltop newspaper referred to her in print as a "lady diver."

In 1967 Arrington defeated the men she competed against in a diving competition in the Central Intercollegiate Athletic Association (CIAA).

Spelman College 
In 1961 a swim club for women at Spelman College was established.

Civil rights activism in pools 

 In 1959 there was a wade in located in Miami's Crandon Park sponsored by CORE.
 1964 Monson Motor Lodge Protests in St. Augustine, FL: During a "wade in" at a motel pool, motel president, poured acid into the pool with protestors in it. The water in the pool diluted the amount of acid poured in so it did not cause damage but the image became well known in the media.

Activists 

 Simone Manuel 
 Brenda Villa
 Lia Neal
 Ashleigh Johnson
 Cullen Jones
 Sabir Muhammad
 Max Irving
 Schuyler Bailar

In the media 

 In May 1969, Fred Rogers or Mr. Rogers, host of the popular children’s show Mister Rogers’ Neighborhood, aired a scene that was directed at the issue of black and white Americans swimming together. In the scene, Mr.Rogers invites black actor Francois Clemmons, who was recurring character Officer Clemmons on the show, to put his feet in a small pool on a hot summer day. The two men then chat by the pool and at the end of the scene Mr. Rogers shares his towel with Officer Clemmons. The scene was interpreted by watchers as a critique of the separation of blacks and whites at pools and a display of how both races can peacefully share the water together. When the scene aired in 1969, segregation was unconstitutional in the United States yet Black Americans still were not treated as equal citizens and did not share pools with fellow White Americans.

References 

Swimming
Anti-black racism in the United States
Aquatics